Zekeriya Yapıcıoğlu (b. 1966; Batman) is a Turkish-Kurdish politician and lawyer in Turkey who led the Kurdish Islamist Free Cause Party from June 2013 to May 2018 and again from June 2021 on.

Biography
Born in 1966 in the city of Batman in the eastern part of Turkey, he worked as a lawyer from 1990 to 2012 after finishing his education as a lawyer in Ankara. He co-founded the Free Cause Party in 2013 in an attempt to consolidate the conservative Kurdish vote. Yapıcıoğlu had previously been a supporter of Kurdish Hezbollah and also stated that the cause of Hüda-Par was the continuation of that of Sheikh Said.

Yapıcıoğlu is Anti-Darwinian and generally uses Islamic rhetoric in his speeches. Moreover, he is against the Kurdistan Workers' Party, anti-America and also criticized the ruling Justice and Development Party's policies and their failure in bringing peace to Kurdish areas.

Electoral history
Yapıcıoğlu ran unsuccessfully as an independent twice in 2015 and in 2018 in the district of Diyarbakır and received 3.4% and 4.3% of the vote share respectively.

References

1966 births
Ankara University Faculty of Law alumni
Free Cause Party politicians
Turkish Kurdish politicians
Living people
21st-century Turkish politicians